Geoffrey Arnold Shindler  (born 21 October 1942) is an English solicitor specialising in the field of wills, trusts and estates law. He is a founding member and president of Society of Trust and Estate Practitioners (STEP).

Early life 
Shindler was born in Manchester, England, to Israel Shindler and Florence Shindller (née Weidberg).

Shindler attended and graduated from Bury Grammar School. He graduated with first class honours from Gonville and Caius College, Cambridge as a W. M. Tapp scholar with Master of Arts and Master of Laws degrees. Shindler qualified as a solicitor in 1969.

Career 
Shindler began his career as a clerk from 1966 to 1968 at the law firm, March Pearson & Skelton, working his way up from assistant solicitor from 1968 to 1971, to partner from 1971 to 1986.

From 1986 to 2005, Shindler was a partner at the Manchester-based law firm, Halliwell Landau Manchester, where he was Head of Trusts and Estates. From 2005 to 2006, he was a senior member at Halliwells.

In April 2006, Shindler left Halliwells after 20 years with the firm to establish a new firm in partnership with Roger Lane-Smith, former Senior Partner of DLA Piper. The new firm, Lane-Smith & Shindler LLP, opened on 2 May 2006. Shindler was at Lane-Smith & Shindler LLP until 2011 when the firm became a part of DWF LLP. From 2011 to 2014, Shindler was a consultant at DWF. Since 2014, he currently works as a partner at Nova Private Client LLP.

Shindler is a member of the editorial board of the Wills & Trusts Law Reports and Tottel's Trust Law International and Consulting Editor of the Trusts and Estates Law & Tax Journal. He also edited Trust Drafting and Precedents.

Shindler contributed to the restructuring and updating of Ray & McLaughlin's Practical Inheritance Tax Planning.

One of the founding members of the Society of Trust and Estate Practitioners (STEP), Shindler was appointed president of STEP worldwide in November 2006. He was instrumental in developing their education program. He is a former chairman of the organisation.

Personal life 
In 1966, Shindler married Gaye Shindler (née Kenton). The couple had three children: British television producer Nicola Shindler, Freya Boroda, and Caroline Conway.

His brother is Colin Shindler, who wrote Manchester United Ruined My Life.

Selected leadership and honors 
 1995-1997: Opera North, Director
 2003–present: Royal Exchange Theatre, Manchester, Director; Chairman, Development Committee (2000-2012)
 2005–present: Manchester Camerata, Board Member; Chairman (2007–2012)
 2006–present: Society of Trust and Estate Practitioners (STEP), STEP Worldwide, President; Chairman (1994-1998); Vice President (1998–2006); STEP Education Committee, Chairman (1999-2006)
 2006–present: Lancashire County Cricket Club, Board Member (2012–present); Vice Chairman (2009-2012); Chairman Business Committee (2008-2012)
 2007: Officer of the Order of the British Empire for services to the administration of justice
 2012–present: Manchester Camerata Charity, Chairman
 2017: STEP Private Client Award for Lifetime Achievement
 International Academy of Estate & Trust Law, Member
 International Compliance Association, Advisory Committee
 Manchester Portico Library Charitable Trust, Trustee
 Tottel's Trust Law International, Editorial Board
 Trust Law Committee, Member
 Trusts and Estates Law & Tax Journal, Editor
 Wills & Trusts Law Reports, Editorial Board

Selected works and publications 
Books
 
 
 
 
Journals

References 

English solicitors
Living people
People educated at Bury Grammar School
1942 births